Cyperus albopilosus is a species of sedge that is native to an area of Africa.

The species was first formally described by the botanist Georg Kükenthal in 1936 and was initially described as Mariscus albopilosus by Charles Baron Clarke.

See also
 List of Cyperus species

References

albopilosus
Plants described in 1936
Taxa named by Georg Kükenthal
Flora of Zimbabwe
Flora of Zambia
Flora of Tanzania
Flora of Nigeria
Flora of Malawi
Flora of Kenya
Flora of Ethiopia